Bruno is a comune (municipality) in the Province of Asti in the Italian region Piedmont, located about  southeast of Turin and about  southeast of Asti.  

Bruno borders the following municipalities: Bergamasco, Carentino, Castelnuovo Belbo, and Mombaruzzo.

References

External links
 Official website

Cities and towns in Piedmont